María Carlota Castrejana Fernández (born 25 April 1973 in Logroño) is a female triple jumper from Spain. Her personal best jump is 14.60 metres, achieved at the 2005 Mediterranean Games in Almería. This is the current national record.

Castrejana has the uncommon achievement of having competed at major championships not only in her main sport triple jump, but also in the high jump at the 1995 World Indoor Championships and long jump at the 2002 European Indoor Championships. She even competed in basketball at the 1992 Summer Olympics.

Competition record

References

External links
Official Site
 

1973 births
Living people
Spanish female triple jumpers
Spanish female high jumpers
Spanish female long jumpers
Athletes (track and field) at the 2000 Summer Olympics
Athletes (track and field) at the 2004 Summer Olympics
Athletes (track and field) at the 2008 Summer Olympics
Olympic athletes of Spain
Basketball players at the 1992 Summer Olympics
Olympic basketball players of Spain
Sportspeople from Logroño
Mediterranean Games silver medalists for Spain
Mediterranean Games bronze medalists for Spain
Athletes (track and field) at the 2001 Mediterranean Games
Athletes (track and field) at the 2005 Mediterranean Games
Mediterranean Games medalists in athletics